The Beach 67th Street station (signed as Beach 67th Street–Arverne By The Sea station) is a station on the IND Rockaway Line of the New York City Subway. Located at Beach 67th Street and Rockaway Freeway in Arverne, Queens, it is served by the A train at all times. The station is adjacent to Kohlreiter Square, a public green space on the north side of the station.

History

The station was originally built as Arverne for the Long Island Rail Road in 1888 at Gaston Avenue, by New York lawyer and developer Remington Vernam. The station and the development were named by his wife who admired the way he signed his checks. The station had a large tower, was shaped like a Victorian hotel and had a connection to the Ocean Electric Railway.

Due to a quarrel between the LIRR and Vernam, another Arverne station was built at Straiton Avenue in 1892. From then on, it was known as Arverne–Gaston Avenue to distinguish it from the Straiton Avenue station. Arverne station was rebuilt on a new site with a simpler structure in May 1912. Like all stations along the Rockaway Beach Branch, it was closed and replaced with the elevated Gaston Avenue station on April 10, 1942, only to be transferred to the New York City Transit Authority on October 3, 1955 and reopened as a subway station on June 28, 1956.

In March 2010, Queens Community Board 14, which represents Arverne, voted in favor of renaming the station from Beach 67th Street–Gaston to Beach 67th Street–Arverne By The Sea. New signs with this name were installed in July 2011.

In 2019, the Metropolitan Transportation Authority announced that this station would become ADA-accessible as part of the agency's 2020–2024 Capital Program. A contract for two elevators at the station was awarded in December 2020.

Station layout

There are two tracks and two side platforms. Trains that leave the station northbound reach the Hammels Wye, where it is possible to head north to Broad Channel (the usual service pattern) or traverse a short single-track segment onto the southbound Rockaway Park-bound branch of the line. This connection was used for the temporary H shuttle from Far Rockaway to Beach 90th Street following Hurricane Sandy, and was used by the Rockaway Park Shuttle for several months in 2018.

Exits

The only active station house beneath the platforms and tracks at the east end has four staircases: two to the street (one to each western corner of Beach 67th Street and Rockaway Freeway) and one to each platform. The mezzanine layout gives evidence that there were originally separate turnstiles for entry and exit. The entry turnstiles are all on one side of the booth while the exit turnstiles are on the opposite side. Since the elimination of the double fare, steel gates have replaced the turnstiles.

A second exit is located at the west end of the Far Rockaway-bound platform which leads to the southeast side of Beach 69th Street and Rockaway Freeway.

References

External links 
 
 
 Station Reporter — A Rockaway
 The Subway Nut — Beach 67th Street – Gaston Pictures 
 Beach 67th Street entrance from Google Maps Street View
 Platforms from Google Maps Street View

IND Rockaway Line stations
New York City Subway stations in Queens, New York
Railway stations in the United States opened in 1956
Rockaway, Queens
1956 establishments in New York City